Accessible publishing is an approach to publishing and book design whereby books and other texts are made available in alternative formats designed to aid or replace the reading process. It is particularly relevant for people who are blind, visually impaired or otherwise print disabled.

Alternative formats that have been developed to aid different people to read include varieties of larger fonts, specialised fonts for certain kinds of reading disabilities, braille, e-books, and automated audiobooks and DAISY digital talking books.

Accessible publishing has been made easier through developments in technology such as print on demand (POD), e-book readers, the XML structured data format, the EPUB3 format and the Internet.

Aim
The aim of accessible publishing is to make reading easier for those who have difficulties doing so. This group includes people who are blind or who have low vision, people with learning disabilities, and people who are learning a second language. Accessible publishing also aims to allow people to read whichever format allows them to read fastest or allows them to absorb the information in a better way.

In the twenty-first century, the accessible publishing aim is to make every book available in all formats so that every reader can read with ease and proficiency.

Guidelines and techniques for publishing in accessible formats have been made available by several organisations and authors, including:
 EDItEUR: "Accessible Publishing - Best Practice Guidelines for Publishers".
 Matt Garrish: "Accessible EPUB 3" (freely available chapter from EPUB 3 Best Practices by Matt Garrish and Markus Gylling, O'Reilly, 2013).
 "Accessible Digital Media Guidelines" by the National Center for Accessible Media (NCAM).
 "Making PDF files accessible: guidelines for the DTP creation phase" by AcceDe PDF.
 "Make a PDF document accessible from Adobe InDesign and Acrobat Pro"
 "Make a PDF document accessible from Microsoft Word"

History
Before the 21st century, the publishing industry focused on the production of printed books. The predominant publishing theory, which stressed economy of scale, tended to make only one format of a given book available. In this way they could be mass-produced and made available for the general public. This model did not allow for any other format to be widely available, however.

There were a number of developments in technology that increased the accessibility of books. The first of these was the development of the braille writing system by Louis Braille in 1821. Then there was the development of audiobooks which originated from the United States Congress in 1931 and became popularised by advances in recording and the use of voice actors.

In 1980, Thorndike Press came into existence as a republisher of large print books. Thorndike bought the rights for large print versions of books from publishers and then republished them in a larger and more accessible format for people with reading difficulties.

Recent developments
New portable readers, such as the Victor Reader products and the Plextalk Pocket handle talking books in a wide variety of formats including DAISY Digital Talking Book, MP3, text only, and many others.

New technology, such as introduced in the Sony Reader of 2004 and Amazon's Kindle in 2007, provided the ability to alter the size of the font automatically.

ReadHowYouWant is another leader in developing this technology. It works in partnership with publishers to make books available in all formats all across the world. This includes specially designed fonts for dyslexia, macular degeneration and line tracking problems.

See also
Audiobook
Braille translator
Computer accessibility
DAISY Digital Talking Book
Readability
Tactile alphabets for the blind
Web accessibility
Web Content Accessibility Guidelines

Accessible publishers:
 BookShare
 German Central Library for the Blind
 Learning Ally, previously named Recording for the Blind & Dyslexic
 National Library Service for the Blind and Physically Handicapped
 Washington Talking Book & Braille Library
 West German Audio Book Library for the Blind

References

External links
National Library Service for the Blind and Physically Handicapped (U.S. Library of Congress) distributes braille materials and Talking Books (custom analog and digital formats) free to blind and low vision users in the United States.
NFB-NEWSLINE (non-profit) offers over 500 newspapers and magazines in a variety of accessible formats (including telephone, a website, email, and mobile app). A free service to blind and low vision US residents who qualify. 
 BookShare (non-profit) offers books, newspapers, and magazines (in DAISY format) free to blind and low vision users who pay an annual membership fee.
Recording for the Blind & Dyslexic offers recorded books in custom digital formats free to blind and low vision users.
Project Gutenberg is a library of public domain books in text format free for download.
HumanWare offers a large list of additional resources available for download.
 Accessible Digital Office Document (ADOD) Project: techniques for creating accessible documents using various office suites such as Microsoft Office, OpenOffice.org, LibreOffice and iWork.

Publishing
Accessible information